Elizabeth Harrison may refer to:

Elizabeth Harrison (artist) (1907-2001), British/Canadian artist, author and educator
Elizabeth Harrison (educator) (1849–1927), U.S. educational reformer, author, and lecturer
Elizabeth Harrison (writer) (1921–2008), pseudonym of the British writer Elizabeth Fancourt Harrison
Elizabeth Harrison Walker (1897–1955), child of the former U.S. President, Benjamin Harrison
Betty Harrison, French tennis player who competed in the 1966 French Championships
Elizabeth Hunt Harrison (1848–1931), one of the founders of the Minnesota Woman Suffrage Association